Shriekfest Horror Film Festival is a film festival specializing in the horror genre. It is the longest running horror festival in Los Angeles. In 2017, Shriekfest expanded to include an Orlando, FL festival location.

History
Shriekfest Horror Film Festival was founded in July 2001. It is the oldest continually running genre festival in Los Angeles, California. It is held in October at Raleigh Studios on Melrose Boulevard in the Charlie Chaplin Theatre.

The festival was founded by actress Denise Gossett with her partner Kimberlee Beeson.  Gossett came up with the idea after starring in the horror film Chain of Souls. She realized there was a scarcity of  film festivals and competitions for the horror genre. She and Beeson created Shriekfest in the hopes that young and upcoming filmmakers and screenwriters would find in it an outlet for their talent. Their partnership lasted until 2003, after which time Todd Beeson became the new partner in the festival.

Shriekfest awards multiple prizes for horror films and screenplays. It also awards films in the science fiction, fantasy, and thriller categories. Prizes include trophies, as well as cash, product awards, and publicity.

The festival also has an under-18 category open to young filmmakers and screenwriters.

Shriekfest went green in 2010 and now accepts screenplays and films via email.

Awards
Shriekfest awards can vary from year to year at judges' requests and have included the following categories. In 2010 two new categories were added to the competition: Webisode and Original Song.
Best Horror Feature Film
Best Sci-Fi Feature Film
Best Fantasy Feature Film
Best Thriller Feature Film
Best Short Film
Best Supershort Film (under 10 minutes)
Best Feature Screenplay
Best Short Screenplay
Best Acting Performance
Best Cinematography
Best Special FX
Best Under-18 Film
Best Under-18 Screenplay
Pretty/Scary Award (portrayal of women in horror)
Audience Choice Award

Past winners

2017 
The following are 2017's full-length feature film award winners:

2016
The following are 2016's full-length feature film award winners:

2015
The following are 2015's full-length feature film award winners:

2014
The following are 2014's full-length feature film award winners:

2013
The following are 2013's full-length feature film award winners:

2012
The following are 2012's full-length feature film award winners:

2011
The following are 2011's full-length feature film award winners:

2010
The following are 2010's full-length feature film award winners:

2009
The following are 2009's full-length feature film award winners:

2008
The following are 2008's full-length feature film award winners:

2007
The following are 2007's full-length feature film award winners:

2006
The following are 2006's full-length feature film award winners:

2005
The following are 2005's full-length feature film award winners:

2004
The following are 2004's full-length feature film award winners:

2003
The following are 2003's full-length feature film award winners:

2002
The following are 2002's full-length feature film award winners:

2001
The following are 2001's full-length feature film award winners:

References

External links
 

Fantasy and horror film festivals in the United States
Film festivals in Los Angeles
Film festivals established in 2001